Imtiaz Ahmed Nakib is a former Bangladeshi  professional footballer who played as a striker for the Bangladesh national football team, during the majority of the 1990s. He has a total of 107 Dhaka League goals and is the current all-time top scorer for Muktijoddha Sangsad KC, with 57 league goals.

Personal life
Nakib was born on 1 September 1974, in Narsingdi. He was brought up in Dhaka, due to his fathers job as a veterinarian.

On 3 July 2018, Nakib suffered a heart attack and was admitted to Ibrahim Cardiac Hospital in Shahbagh.

Life after retirement
Nakib is the current Team Manager of Dhaka Mohammedan.

Club career

Early years
Nakib's journey with football began after his father switched jobs to Badda district in 1980. He started playing in with neighborhood kids their and in 1985, one of his friends invited him to meet the coach of local club Badda Jagarani. Nakib started his club career with pioneer league team Badda Jagarani Chakra in 1986, while he was still at secondary school. Nakib had previously played as a goalkeeper for his school, however, after being convinced the clubs coach Sayeed Hassan Kanan, who was also the national team goalkeeper at the time, Nakib registered at the club as a striker, even though he never played the role before. He played in pioneer division from 1986 to 1997 and then in the Third Division league in 1988, although he failed to secure a permanent place in the starting lineup during that time. Nakib was also a regular member of the Dhaka University football team. In the late 1990s Nakib's family wanted him to quit playing as he was not able to find a sustainable source of income by playing in a semi-professional league, however, in 1989, he got an offer from Dhaka Mohammedan, who were the biggest club in Bangladesh at the time. The surprise move took place because Nakib managed to survive a trial for Bangladesh U16 in 1988 and after the trial the Bangladesh Football Federation, placed a new rule on Dhaka League clubs, where a team has to sign 2 new players at the start of each season, and so, Nakib ended up at Mohammedan to fill the new player quota.

Dhaka league and Asia
Nakib scored 7 goals in the league during his first season. He also helped Mohammedan reach the quarter-finals of the 1990–91 Asian Club Championship, his goals came against Salgaocar FC from India and also against Club Lagoons from Maldives. Nakib's record of scoring in Asian competitions continued, as he scored against five different during the 1991 Asian Club Championship. In 1994 all the big named players in the country joined Muktijoddha Sangsad KC and Nakib was also forced to leave by the club officials, who did not know at the time that their decision will come to haunt them. Nakib was top scorer for 4 straight seasons becoming only the second player after Sheikh Mohammad Aslam to achieve the feat, which only further increased the comparisons between the two. He scored 12 goals in 1995 and 13 in 1996. In 1997 Muktijoddha played Mohammedan in the final matchday of the season. Mohammedan needed only a point to win the league, however, Muktijoddha's captain Nakib scored a brace and in thereby won the team their first ever league title, leaving the Mohammedan club officials and fans in dismay. From 1994 to 1999, Nakib scored a total of 57 league goals for the club, making him the clubs all-time leading goal scorer, before rejoining Mohammedan in 1999. During his time at Muktijoddha and during his second spell at Mohammedan Nakib was reported to be paid a monthly salary of 7 lakh Bangladeshi taka. 

One of his most influential games came in 2000, for Mohammedan against their arch-rivals Dhaka Abahani, a game were Mohammedan were trailing by 2 goals, however, Nakib scored a hattrick, making him only the second ever player to score thrice during the Dhaka Derby. The game ended 4-3, with Motiur Munna, scoring in the dying moments of the match. This game helped Nakib regain the love of the Mohammedan supporters, after he became the clubs villain while playing for Muktijoddha. Nakib also spent a year with Indian giants Mohun Bagan A.C. in the National Football League from 2000 to 2001, during the decline of the Dhaka league and Bangladeshi football in general. 
 Nakib again returned to Mohammedan in 2001, and scored 5 goals that year for the runner-up team in the league. On 23 March 2007, Nakib retired after playing his last Dhaka Derby for Mohammedan. The veteran struck 107 goals in Dhaka league in his 18-year long career and scored another 45 to 50 goals in different tournaments, he also found the net against numerous Asian opponents during AFC Club competitions. His most well known strikes in continental competitions came against Thai club Port FC, Qatari club Al-Rayyan SC and Al Shabab from UAE, all of which came during the 1991 Asian Club Championship. He also has several goals against south Asian opposition during AFC tournaments.

International career

Olympic team
Nakib scored 8 goals for the Under-23 team during the  Olympic Football qualifiers in 1991. He scored 5 times against the Philippines U23, as Bangladesh defeated them 8-0. He also managed to score a brace against the Philippines in the return game. During the last qualifying game, Nakib  scored an important headed goal from a Mamun Joarder cross to earn Bangladesh a win against the Malaysia U23 team.

Bangladesh national team
From 1990 to 1999 Nakib played for the Bangladesh national team. However, even though he was not dropped from selection and kept on scoring in the league during these 9 years, Nakib failed to solidify a starting spot in the national team. According to him it was due to the fact that the Mohammedan staff and coaches held a grudge against him for joining Muktijoddha. The club officials forced the national team coach to not play him. Nakib's greatest game for the National team came during Bangladesh's first ever title triumph, the 4-nation Tiger Trophy in Myanmar. During the final Bangladesh took on the hosts. Myanmar had already defeated the nation during the opening match of the tournament, however, this time  a change of tactics brought in by coach Otto Pfister, helped Bangladesh outplay their opponents. Bangladesh took the lead through Mamun Joarder, but soon Myanmar equalized, and it was the Mamun-Nakib combination play which earned Bangladesh the winner, when Nakib headed the ball in from a Mamun Joarder cross during the last moments of the game. Nakib also scored during the 1997 South Asian Football Federation Gold Cup against Maldives, which ended up being his last ever goal for his country. During the 1999 South Asian Football Federation Gold Cup, Bangladesh coach at the time, Samir Shaker told Nakib "You are not allowed to join the team", forcing him to retire from the national team.

Style of play
Nakib was well known for his headed goals and strength. He was often compared with the country's legendary striker Sheikh Mohammad Aslam due to his ability to score headers and win aerial duels.

International goals
Scores and results list Bangladesh's goal tally first.

Bangladesh U23

Bangladesh

International goals for club
Scores and results list Dhaka Mohammedan's goal tally first.

Dhaka Mohammedan

Honours

International 
Bangladesh
 Four-nation International Invitational Football Tournament 
1995

References

Living people
1974 births
People from Narsingdi District
Bangladeshi footballers
Bangladesh international footballers
Mohammedan SC (Dhaka) players
Association football forwards
Bangladeshi expatriate sportspeople in India
Bangladeshi expatriate footballers
Expatriate footballers in India
Calcutta Football League players
Mohun Bagan AC players
Muktijoddha Sangsad KC players
Asian Games competitors for Bangladesh
Footballers at the 1990 Asian Games
South Asian Games bronze medalists for Bangladesh
South Asian Games silver medalists for Bangladesh